Kenechukwu "KC" Ndefo (born March 1, 2000) is an American college basketball player for the Seton Hall Pirates of the Big East Conference. He previously played for the Saint Peter's Peacocks.

High school career
Ndefo began his high school career at Elmont Memorial High School. He helped lead team to a Class A state title as a sophomore. Ndefo helped Elmont Memorial win the Nassau Championship as a junior. He finished with 22 points, 14 rebounds and five blocks in the title game and hit the game-winning buzzer-beating shot in the 58–56 win against South Side High School. After his junior season, Ndefo transferred to Abraham Lincoln High School. He averaged 14 points and 9 rebounds per game as a senior. In January 2018, the New York Board of Education ruled Ndefo ineligible, causing him to miss the remainder of the season. He committed to playing college basketball for Saint Peter's, the only Division 1 school to offer him a scholarship.

College career
As a freshman, Ndefo averaged 7.8 points and 5 rebounds per game. Ndefo averaged 8.5 points, 5.3 rebounds, 2.4 blocks and 1.4 steals per game as a sophomore. He was named MAAC Defensive Player of the Year, MAAC Sixth Man of the Year, and Third Team All-MAAC. Ndefo posted a career-high seven blocks against Siena on January 23, 2021. On February 26, he scored a career-high 22 points in a 66–52 win against Rider. As a junior, Ndefo averaged 13.7 points, 6.5 rebounds, 1.5 assists and 1.4 steals per game while shooting 50 percent from the floor. His 3.6 blocks per game led Division 1 in that category, and he was the shortest player to lead the nation in blocked shots per game since William Mosley of Northwestern State in 2011. He was named to the First Team All-MAAC as well as repeating as MAAC Defensive Player of the Year. Following the season, Ndefo entered the transfer portal, but ultimately returned to Saint Peter's. On February 4, 2022, he scored 14 points and had a program-high 11 blocks in an 83–74 victory over Quinnipiac. Ndefo also surpassed the 1,000 point mark during the game. He was named to the Third Team All-MAAC as well as MAAC Defensive Player of the Year for the third consecutive season, becoming only the third player in MAAC history to win the award three times. Ndefo helped lead the Peacocks to a MAAC tournament title and a surprising run to the Elite 8 in the subsequent NCAA tournament as a 15-seed. Following the season, Ndefo declared for the 2022 NBA draft and entered the NCAA transfer portal.

On May 28, 2022, Ndefo transferred to Seton Hall, following his head coach Shaheen Holloway, who left Saint Peter's after the 2021–22 season to fill the head coaching vacancy at his alma mater.

Career statistics

College

|-
| style="text-align:left;"| 2018–19
| style="text-align:left;"| Saint Peter's
| 31 || 19 || 27.3 || .437 || .222 || .657 || 5.0 || .9 || .9 || 1.8 || 7.8
|-
| style="text-align:left;"| 2019–20
| style="text-align:left;"| Saint Peter's
| 28 || 2 || 22.0 || .462 || .000 || .636 || 5.3 || 1.1 || 1.4 || 2.4 || 8.5
|-
| style="text-align:left;"| 2020–21
| style="text-align:left;"| Saint Peter's
| 25 || 24 || 28.8 || .504 || .118 || .597 || 6.5 || 1.5 || 1.4 || style="background:#cfecec;" | 3.6* || 13.7
|-
| style="text-align:left;"| 2021–22
| style="text-align:left;"| Saint Peter's
| 34 || 34 || 25.9 || .470 || .286 || .537 || 6.1 || 2.4 || 1.3 || 2.8 || 10.5
|- class="sortbottom"
| style="text-align:center;" colspan="2"| Career
| 118 || 79 || 25.9 || .471 || .203 || .599 || 5.7 || 1.5 || 1.2 || 2.6 || 10.0

References

External links
Saint Peter's Peacocks bio

2000 births
Living people
Abraham Lincoln High School (Brooklyn) alumni
American men's basketball players
American sportspeople of Nigerian descent
Basketball players from New York (state)
People from Elmont, New York
Power forwards (basketball)
Saint Peter's Peacocks men's basketball players
Seton Hall Pirates men's basketball players
Sportspeople from Nassau County, New York